Schreckensteinioidea is a superfamily in the insect order Lepidoptera containing a single family, Schreckensteiniidae, or "bristle-legged moths", because of the stout spines on the hindlegs. The superfamily and family were both described by Thomas Bainbrigge Fletcher in 1929. The relationships of this family within the group apoditrysia are currently uncertain. One of the species, the blackberry skeletoniser (Schreckensteinia festaliella), is widespread and common across Europe and has been introduced as a biological control to Hawaii, whilst three species of Corsocasis occur in South East Asia (Dugdale et al., 1999).

References
Dugdale, J. S., Kristensen, N. P., Robinson, G. S. and Scoble, M. J. (1999). The smaller microlepidoptera grade superfamilies, Ch.13., pp. 217–232 in Kristensen, N.P. (Ed.). Lepidoptera, Moths and Butterflies. Volume 1: Evolution, Systematics, and Biogeography. Handbuch der Zoologie. Eine Naturgeschichte der Stämme des Tierreiches / Handbook of Zoology. A Natural History of the phyla of the Animal Kingdom. Band / Volume IV Arthropoda: Insecta Teilband / Part 35: 491 pp. Walter de Gruyter, Berlin, New York.
Firefly Encyclopedia of Insects and Spiders, edited by Christopher O'Toole, 2002

External links
Swedish Moths
UKMoths

 
Moth families